Mellow is the second album by Maria Mena. Released in Norway as a counterpart to her US album White Turns Blue, it was accompanied by the single "You're the Only One". The album was produced by Arvid Solvang.

Track listing

Due to the other three singles of the album, "Just A Little Bit", "Take You With Me" and "Patience" failing to chart, "So Sweet" was not released as a single, despite the sticker on the front of the CD advertising it as one.

Certifications

References

2004 albums
Maria Mena albums